Liberland, also known as the Free Republic of Liberland, is a micronation in Southeast Europe claiming an uninhabited parcel of disputed land on the western bank of the Danube, between Croatia and Serbia (locally known as Gornja Siga). It was proclaimed on 13 April 2015 by the Czech right-libertarian politician and activist Vít Jedlička.

The official website of Liberland states that the nation was created in the wake of the ongoing Croatia–Serbia border dispute. According to Jedlička, this dispute resulted in a plot of land west of the Danube that was not claimed by either side.

It has been administered by Croatia since the Croatian War of Independence. Liberland has no diplomatic recognition from any recognized nation. The land lacks infrastructure and lies on the floodplain of the Danube.

Location 

The dispute regarding the border along the Danube River valley first arose in 1947 but was left unresolved during the existence of the Socialist Federal Republic of Yugoslavia. It became a contentious issue after the break-up of Yugoslavia. Serbia holds the opinion that the thalweg of the Danube valley and the centre line of the river represents the international border between the two countries. Croatia disagrees and claims that the international border lies along the boundaries of the cadastral municipalities located along the riverdeparting from the course at several pointsreflecting the course of the Danube which existed in the 19th century before meandering and hydraulic engineering works altered its course. As a result, Croatia claims a large part of the disputed area controlled by Serbia, while Serbia does not claim the much smaller parts controlled by Croatia.

Jedlička says that the land he has claimed, known as Gornja Siga (meaning upper tufa), was not claimed by either side.

There are no residents. A journalist from the Czech newspaper  who visited the area in April 2015 found a house that had been abandoned for about thirty years, according to people living in the vicinity. The access road was reported to be in a bad condition.

The Danube, an international waterway with free access to the Black Sea for several landlocked nations, runs along the self-proclaimed territory.

History

Proclamation 

The flag raising in Gornja Siga was performed by Vít Jedlička and some of his associates on the same day the republic was proclaimed. Jedlička is a member of the Czech Party of Free Citizens, which bases its values on the classical liberal ideology.

Jedlička stated that no nation claims the land as its own and he therefore could claim it using the terra nullius doctrine. The border, he argued, was defined in accordance with Croatian and Serbian border claims and did not interfere with any other state's sovereignty. Jedlička said in April 2015 that an official diplomatic note would be sent to both Croatia and Serbia, and later to all other states, with a formal request for international recognition.

On 18 December 2015, Jedlička held an event at which he presented the first provisional government of Liberland and its ministers of finance, foreign affairs, interior and justice as well as two vice presidents.

Access 
Croatian authorities have frequently blocked access to the area since the beginning of May 2015.

In May 2015, Vít Jedlička and his translator Sven Sambunjak were briefly detained by Croatian police after making an attempt to cross the border. Jedlička spent one night in detention and then was convicted and ordered to pay a fine for illegal crossing of the Croatian border but appealed the verdict. He claimed that there were at least three Liberland citizens inside the area, who came from Switzerland.
Later that month, Vít Jedlička was detained again. Initially, reporters were able to enter the area with Jedlička but subsequently they were also denied entry, including journalists from the Serbian public broadcast service Radio Television of Vojvodina, and from the Bosnian newspaper Dnevni avaz.

The detained were from various countries, including the Republic of Ireland, Germany, Denmark, and the United States. Croatian police have continued detaining people, including those that entered the area by boat (via an international waterway). One of them, Danish activist Ulrik Grøssel Haagensen, was placed in house arrest for 5 days before being sentenced to 15 days of prison, triggering some protests in Denmark.

In May 2016, several appeals court decisions from Croatia were published. The court upheld that the crossings from Croatia were illegal, but found the convictions for crossings from Serbia improper. The court said that the lower court committed "a fundamental breach of misdemeanour proceedings" and "essential procedural violations". It further ruled that "the facts were incorrectly and incompletely established [by the prosecutor] which could lead to misapplication of substantive law". A retrial was ordered in 6 of the 7 appeals. The lower court is required to determine the location of the border and the border crossing.

In 2022, the American travel videographer Drew Binsky visited Liberland's "Floating Man" summer festival in Serbia. Together with some other attendants, he made an attempt to enter the area claimed by Liberland, using a boat from the Serbian side of the Danube. The group was intercepted by Croatian police and ordered to return.

Public reactions 
Journalists have been uncertain as to how serious Jedlička is about his claims, with some calling it a publicity stunt.

In an interview with Parlamentní Listy in April 2015, Jedlička claimed that he had received positive reactions for his initiative, mainly from his own party, the Party of Free Citizens, for which he was a regional chairman, but also from some members of the Civic Democratic Party and the Pirate Party.

On 20 May 2015, Petr Mach, the leader of the Party of Free Citizens, expressed support for the creation of a state based on ideas of freedom, adding that the Party of Free Citizens wants the Czech Republic to become a similarly free country.

Dominik Stroukal from the Czech-Slovak branch of the Ludwig von Mises Institute wrote: "The escapade succeeded for Vít. The whole world reports about Liberland with words like 'tax competition', 'libertarianism', etc."

Goran Vojković, professor of law and columnist from the Croatian news portal Index.hr, described Liberland as a "circus which threatens Croatian territory", and argued that there was a risk that Croatia's claim to control land on the other side of the Danube may be weakened by the attention that the Liberland project has drawn to the border dispute.

In 2016, an article in Stratfor summarized the initiative as follows: "Liberland is a curious case because, in principle, none of the actors that could claim control over it seems interested in doing so. But this will probably remain a curiosity with negligible consequences at the international level. For the rest of the world's disputed territories, violence and diplomacy will remain the main tools to claim ownership."

Official statements from recognized states 

 : Liberland has been mentioned by the Croatian Ministry of Foreign and European Affairs but publicly rejected as a joke. On 29 June 2015, the Croatian Ministry of Foreign affairs said that Gornja Siga's status is undetermined, but it is not terra nullius, and after international arbitration, it will be awarded to Croatia or Serbia, not to a third party. However, in a May 2016 letter to the Croatian Interior Minister Vlaho Orepić, Croatian Minister of Foreign and European Affairs Miro Kovač referred to Liberland as "a provocative idea which has reached serious proportions" which "represents a risk to the Republic of Croatia." The letter called for finding a solution to "remove promotion and attempts of realization of idea of Liberland", recommending that "Ministry of the Interior, Security and Intelligence Agency (SIA), Ministry of Justice and Ministry of Foreign and European Affairs coordinate necessary measures and their actions, so that this provocative idea could be stopped." On 17 January 2017, Liberland was discussed and debated in the Croatian Parliament (Sabor) by politician Ivan Pernar of the Živi Zid party, who claimed that Croatia should consider the recognition.
 : The Serbian Ministry of Foreign Affairs has stated that Liberland does not infringe upon the border of Serbia, but the project is seen as "frivolous".
 : The Czech Ministry of Foreign Affairs disassociated itself from the activities of Mr. Jedlička, stating it has nothing to do with them. The ministry added that "Mr. Jedlička, as well as other Czech citizens staying in the territory of Croatia or Serbia, are obliged to abide by the local legal code. The Czech Republic considers the activities of Mr. Jedlička inappropriate and potentially harmful." Through the Embassy of the Czech Republic in Zagreb, it warned that the "efforts to create some new 'state' have no basis in international law," and that "in the territory of Croatia, citizens of the Czech Republic as well as other foreigners are obliged to adhere to the Croatian legal code, including the current regime on the Croatian-Serbian border. Crossing the Croatian border (i.e., the external border of the European Union) outside specified border crossings, as it is done by travellers to the so-called Liberland, is in clear violation of the code."
 : The Egyptian Ministry of Foreign Affairs has warned people of the possibility of scams about Liberland directed at people looking for jobs abroad. "Egyptians should seek information from the Foreign Ministry rather than social media before travelling for work."
 : In October 2022, Liberland announced that the Minister of Agriculture for Malawi had signed an agriculture-related Memorandum of Understanding (MoU) with Liberland. The minister has since left office, and various officials of the government of Malawi have denied knowledge of such an agreement.

Legal analysis 
Legal experts in both Serbia and Croatia have said that, under international law, Jedlička lacks the right to claim the area, which is currently the subject of a dispute between the two nations. Croatia and Serbia have dismissed Jedlička's claims as frivolous, although the two countries have reacted in different ways. On 24 April 2015, the Serbian Ministry of Foreign Affairs stated that while they consider the affair a trivial matter, the "new state" does not infringe upon the Serbian border, which is delineated by the Danube. Croatia, which currently administers the land in question, has stated that after international arbitration, it should be awarded to Croatia or Serbia, not to a third party.

An article in the Chicago Journal of International Law, the law review of the University of Chicago Law School, examined Liberland's claim to statehood in light of the criteria laid out by the Montevideo Convention. According to the author, "Croatia’s insistence that Liberland is part of Serbia could constitute a renunciation of Croatia’s legal rights to Liberland. Conversely, if the territory that Liberland claims as its own is Serbian, the Serbian government’s renunciation of its title to that land could also be a quitclaim that would transform the legal status of the land to terra nullius. In both instances, the territory would belong to the first entityin this case Liberlandto claim it. However, because of the complicated history of the Croatian-Serbian border region, it may be difficult to ascertain who the land belongs to under international law."

An article in the Michigan Journal of International Law argues that the United Nations should recognize Liberland.

Plan of administration 
A government with ten to twenty members has been suggested for the administration of Liberland, to be elected by electronic voting. In an interview, Jedlička said he intended to operate on an open-border policy. The goal of the micronation, as claimed by its website, is to create "a society where righteous people can prosper with minimal state regulations and taxes". The founders are inspired by countries like Monaco and Liechtenstein.

A draft version of a codified constitution has been published on liberland.org. and a list of laws to be included in the constitution. These documents describe Liberland as a country governed under a three-power system with executive, legislative and judicial sectors that seek to promote individual rights, including property rights, freedom of speech and the right to keep and bear arms. It has also a list of criminal offences, which include "polluting environment", "public nuisance" in addition to crimes such as murder, manslaughter and theft. There are plans for an official cryptocurrency called the merit, although all other currencies would be allowed. There will be a maximum of 700 million merits.

In an attempt to gain recognition at the UN, Liberland appointed 70 representatives in over 60 countries within a year of proclamation. As of February 2018, Liberland had recruited over 100 representatives in over 80 countries.

Recognition 
There has been no diplomatic recognition of Liberland by any member of the United Nations. Jedlička has visited another unrecognized republic, Somaliland, a self-declared state that proclaimed its independence from Somalia in 1991, and discussed mutual recognition with them.

A few micronations have expressed support for the idea of Liberland.
 The Kingdom of Enclava, which claims part of the disputed pocket north of Liberland, has recognized Liberland.
 The Kingdom of North Sudan, which claims the Bir Tawil area on the border between Egypt and Sudan, has recognized Liberland.
 The Principality of Sealand has indicated its support for Liberland.

In October 2022, a memorandum of understanding was signed between Liberland and Malawi, causing criticism in Malawi, including questions as to why an agreement had been made with a country with no population or economy, and suggestions of a "scam".

See also 

 Night-watchman state
 Politics of Croatia
 List of micronations
 Micronation flags

References

External links

 Official website
 Documentary film about Liberland – "This No Man’s Land Of Mine"

2015 establishments in Croatia
2015 establishments in Serbia
Croatia–Serbia border
Territorial disputes of Croatia
Territorial disputes of Serbia
Danubian micronations
Svobodní
Libertarianism